Kosher Supervision of America is a not-for-profit Kashrut organization based in Los Angeles, California, United States which was certified to operate as of January 31, 1996. Its primary purpose is to certify food as kosher. The Kashrus Administrator is Rabbi Binyomin Lisbon.

References

External links
Official site
California Secretary of State Record

Kosher food certification organizations
Companies based in Los Angeles
Orthodox Judaism in Los Angeles